The women's 800 metres at the 2022 World Athletics Indoor Championships took place on 19–20 March 2022.

Summary
Heavy favorite for gold, Great Britain's Keely Hodgkinson, withdrew from the event due to a quad injury. Eight women qualified into the six lane track, four of them had to share lanes.  Ajeé Wilson, paired with Freweyni Hailu, ran her first four steps fast off the line to immediately give her clear running in her lane, then she settled into her own pace.  Natoya Goule, alone in lane 5, ran a fast first turn to have a clear lead at the break.  Halimah Nakaayi and Habitam Alemu lined up on her shoulder, while Wilson took the inside. Catriona Bisset came up to box Wilson along the rail while Goule held the lead.  Just past the half way point, Bisset slowed to release Wilson from the box, which Wilson confirmed by drifting to her right, blocking Bisset from returning to that position.  Wilson waited until the next straightaway, when she capitalized on her freedom, speeding past Alemu, Nakaayi and Goule just before the bell.  And Wilson just kept going, opening up a 4 metre lead on the field by the backstretch.  Goule began to fade, as Nakaayi gave chase.  But Wilson was uncatchable on her way to a clear win.  From sixth place entering the final turn, Hailu drifted to the outside of lane 2 and sprinted past the field, passing Nakaayi 2 metres out for silver.

Results

Heats
Qualification: First 2 in each heat (Q) and the next 2 fastest (q) advance to the Final.

The heats were started at 11:44.

Final
The final was started at 18:07.

References

800 metres
800 metres at the World Athletics Indoor Championships